Charaxes mixtus is a butterfly in the family Nymphalidae. It is found in Cameroon, the Central African Republic, Gabon, the Republic of the Congo, the Democratic Republic of the Congo and Tanzania.

Description
Ch. mixtus Rothsch. The male is very similar to that of tiridates and only differs in having the marginal spots of the forewing short and whitish and the marginal streaks of the hindwing thick, undivided, blue; the blue spots behind the middle of the hindwing are also much larger than in tiridates. The female is considerably larger than the male but similar in colour and markings, hence entirely different from tiridates female . Cameroons 
and Congo.

Biology
The habitat consists of lowland forests.

Notes on the biology of mixtus are given by Kielland (1990)

Taxonomy
Charaxes tiridates group

The supposed clade members are:
Charaxes tiridates
Charaxes numenes similar to next
Charaxes bipunctatus similar to last
Charaxes violetta
Charaxes fuscus
Charaxes mixtus
Charaxes bubastis
Charaxes albimaculatus
Charaxes barnsi
Charaxes bohemani
Charaxes schoutedeni
Charaxes monteiri
Charaxes smaragdalis
Charaxes xiphares
Charaxes cithaeron
Charaxes nandina
Charaxes imperialis
Charaxes ameliae
Charaxes pythodoris
? Charaxes overlaeti
For a full list see Eric Vingerhoedt, 2013.

Subspecies
Charaxes mixtus mixtus (Cameroon, south-western Central African Republic, Gabon, Congo, Democratic Republic of the Congo)
Charaxes mixtus tanzanicus Kielland, 1988 (north-western Tanzania)

References

Victor Gurney Logan Van Someren, 1972 Revisional notes on African Charaxes (Lepidoptera: Nymphalidae). Part VIII. Bulletin of the British Museum (Natural History) (Entomology)215-264. also as Charaxes bubastis

External links
Images of C. mixtus mixtus Royal Museum for Central Africa (Albertine Rift Project)
Charaxes mixtus images at Consortium for the Barcode of Life
Charaxes mixtus mixtus images at BOLD
Charaxes mixtus tanzanicus images at BOLD

Butterflies described in 1894
mixtus
Butterflies of Africa